Carey Island is an island in Selangor, Malaysia. It is administered by the Zone 17 of the Kuala Langat Municipal Council. Carey Island is located to the south of Port Klang and north of Banting town. It is a huge island separated from the Selangor coast by the Langat River, connected by two bridges from Chodoi and Teluk Panglima Garang near Banting and a bridge from Pulau Indah and Pulau Carey.

History
It was named after Edward Valentine John Carey, an English planter in Malaya who acquired the island from Sultan Sir Alaeddin Sulaiman Shah of Selangor to start rubber plantations. Since then, and until now, the island has been known as Carey Island or Pulau Carey. Carey began a plantation industry under the company Jugra Land and Carey Ltd. Rubber was introduced to Carey Island in 1905 and a permanent work force was established in 1907. Despite its name, many locals from Klang do not consider it a real island compared to Crab Island due to its proximity to the mainland and the river that separates it from the mainland is practically a stream.

Features
It is famous for its seafood such as crabs, prawns, and various fishes. The island has palm oil plantations owned by Sime Darby Plantations. It is an initial settlement area for the Mah-Meri, one of the aborigine Orang Asli tribes of Malaysia. They have assimilated into modern life, with jobs in the nearby plantations and farms, but they retain their unique culture and way of life. Apart from exhibitions of their traditional dances and music, the Mah Meri are particularly known for their votive sculptures, fashioned from a kind of swamp hardwood known as "Nyireh Batu".

See also
 List of islands of Malaysia

References

Islands of Selangor
Kuala Langat District
Nature sites of Selangor